The FMW World Brass Knuckles Heavyweight Championship was a premiere championship in the wrestling promotion Frontier Martial-Arts Wrestling (FMW).

Title history

Names

Reigns

Combined reigns

Footnotes

References

External links
 Title History at solie.org

Frontier Martial-Arts Wrestling championships
Hardcore wrestling championships
Heavyweight wrestling championships